Chaga, also Kichaga or Kichagga, is a Bantu dialect continuum spoken by the Chaga people of northern Tanzania, south of Mount Kilimanjaro.
They also speak 9 dialects: Kivunjo, Kimarangu, Kirombo, Kimachame, Kisiha, Kikibosho, Kiuru, Kioldimoshi and Kingassa.

The Chaga languages are:

West Kilimanjaro (West Chaga), including Meru and Machame
 Central Kilimanjaro (Central Chaga), including Mochi (Old Moshi) and Wunjo
 Rombo
 Rusha (Arusha-Chini)
 Kahe
 Gweno

References 

 
Languages of Tanzania